Oscar Fulton (March 22, 1843 – November 22, 1907) was an Ontario merchant and political figure. He represented Stormont in the House of Commons of Canada as a Liberal-Conservative member from 1878 to 1882.

He was born in Cornwall Township in Canada West in 1843. He operated a store, sawmill and tannery at Avonmore in partnership with his brother-in-law; they were also involved in the sale of lumber.

External links 
 

1843 births
1907 deaths
Conservative Party of Canada (1867–1942) MPs
Members of the House of Commons of Canada from Ontario
People from the United Counties of Stormont, Dundas and Glengarry